Victoria Line is the name given to several things, usually due to an association with Queen Victoria:

 Victoria line, a London Underground line in London
 Victoria Lines, a series of forts, batteries and defensive walls in Malta